Karolina Saverino (born 22 September 2004) is an American rhythmic gymnast, member of the national group.

Personal life 
Karolina took up the sport in 2008, she discovered the sport after taking part in a summer class at the North Shore Rhythmic Gymnastics Center. Her favourite apparatus is hoop. Her dream is to compete at the Olympic Games. Outside the gym her hobbies are cycling, reading, travel, drawing, playing golf, movies, watching TV.

Career 
Karolina entered the starting five of the national senior group in 2021, debuting at the World Championships in Kitakyushu along Camilla Feeley, Isabella Ivanova, Nicole Khoma, Gergana Petkova, Emily Wilson. The finished in 10th in the All-Around, with 5 hoops and 3 hoops and 4 clubs.

In 2022 she took part in the World Cup in Pamplona where they were 10th in the All-Around. A week later she competed in Portimão finishing 10th in the All-Around and with 5 hoops and 9th with 3 ribbons and 2 balls. In June she took part in the World Cup in Pesaro taking 13th place in the All-Around, 11th with 5 hoops and 13th with 3 ribbons and 2 balls. Saverino represented the USA at the Pan American Gymnastics Championships with Maria Bolkhovitinova, Katrine Sakhnov, Gergana Petkova, Hana Starkman, Emily Wilson, winning bronze in the All-Around as well as the two event finals. In late August she competed at the World Cup in Cluj-Napoca where the group was 12th in the All-Around, 14th with 5 hoops and 12th with 3 ribbons and 2 balls. In September Karolina attended the World Championships in Sofia along Katrine Sakhnov, Gergana Petkova, Hana Starkman, Emily Wilson, they took 15th place in the All-Around and with 5 hoops, 16th with 3 ribbons and 2 balls.

References 

American rhythmic gymnasts
Living people
2004 births
21st-century American women